Gioseppa Maria Camilla, commonly known as Giuseppina (or also Josephina) Grassini (8 April 1773 – 3 January 1850) was a noted Italian  dramatic contralto, and a singing teacher. She was also known for her affairs with Napoleon and the Duke of Wellington. She sang in various productions by composers such as Cimarosa, Cherubini and Zingarelli.

Biography 

After growing up under the musical guidance of her mother, an amateur violinist, and Domenico Zucchinetti in Varese, and Antonio Secchi in Milan, Grassini made her stage début in 1789 in Parma singing in Guglielmi's La pastorella nobile, and the following year at Milan's La Scala in three opere buffe including Guglielmi's La bella pescatrice and Salieri's La cifra. These first comic performances were not a great success, and Grassini was driven to resume the study of singing and to turn to drama.

Beginnings and Italian career apex 
From 1792 she returned fully to the stage in the theatres of Vicenza, Venice, Milan again, Naples and Ferrara. She sang (among others) in the first Scala performance of Zingarelli's Artaserse (1793), in the première of Portugal's Demofoonte (1794), in Bertoni's  (Euridice), in Mayr's Telemaco nell’isola di Calipso (première, 1797), in Cimarosa's Artemisia regina di Caria (première, 1797) and in the first Fenice performance of Nasolini's La morte di Semiramide (1798, title role). Her year of glory, however, was 1796, when she created two roles which remained in the repertoire for some decades and are now famous, in both appearing beside the soprano castrato Girolamo Crescentini, who was also Grassini's master and whose teachings she followed faithfully throughout her life. Nicola Zingarelli wrote the part of Giulietta for her in his opera Giulietta e Romeo, staged at Milan's La Scala on January 30, while Domenico Cimarosa composed the role of Horatia (Orazia) in Gli Orazi e i Curiazi, staged instead in northern Italy's second most important theatre, Venice's La Fenice, on December 26. In that same year Grassini took part moreover in a third première of Gaetano Marinelli's Issipile, which was by no means as successful as the others.

Napoleonic period and retirement 
On June 4, 1800, shortly before the victory at Marengo, while interpreting Andreozzi's La vergine del sole at La Scala, Milan, Grassini (who was, by this time, already well known for her unruly love affairs) made a strong hit with Napoleon Bonaparte. He enrolled her among his lovers and brought her to Paris, where she sang in several concerts. Grassini's relationship with the First Consul was probably not convenient, but it was a sign of her modern, free attitude, so that when she in turn took a liking to the violinist Pierre Rode, she did not hesitate to embark upon a fresh affair with him (practically under the nose of the future Emperor), and to quit Paris for an 1801 concert tour in the Netherlands and Germany, returning finally to Italy.

In the years 1804 and 1805 Grassini was in London where, at the King's Theatre, she sang in some revivals of Andreozzi's La vergine del sole, Nasolini's La morte di Cleopatra and Fioravanti's Camilla, as well as in the premières of von Winter's Il ratto di Proserpina and Zaira. In “Il ratto” there appeared Elizabeth Billington, too, and the two prima-donnas confronted each other in a singing contest from which the Italian singer emerged triumphant.

In 1806 Grassini returned to Paris together with her former master Crescentini, where she was appointed first chamber virtuosa of Emperor Napoleon. At the Tuileries Palace Grassini was on stage as the protagonist in the première of Paër's La Didone and in Cherubini's Pimmalione.
 
After settling in Rome during Napoleon's exile on the Isle of Elba, she went back to Paris during the Hundred Days. Having stayed there after the Restoration, she also became the lover of Wellington. He was at that time appointed British ambassador in France, but Grassini was soon forced to leave French territory because Louis XVIII was unwilling to tolerate the great popularity of Napoleon's former lover.

After a further stay in London, where she had been engaged at the Haymarket Theatre, and where she took part in the première of Pucitta's Aristodemo, she eventually made her way back to Italy and there continued to sing in operatic theatres. She sang in Brescia, Padua, Trieste, Florence and, in 1817, again at La Scala, without, however, achieving such success as formerly she had been accorded. She retired from the stage in 1823 and finally settled in Milan, giving herself up also to teaching, among other pupils, Giuditta Pasta and her own nieces Giulia and Giuditta Grisi. She died at the age of 76 in 1850.

Artistic style 
Although critics as usual could not agree, Giuseppina Grassini was undoubtedly one of the greatest stage singers of the 18th and 19th centuries. Commonly classed as a contralto, Grassini sang, in fact, in tessiture which would later be ascribed to mezzo-sopranos  and had rather a narrow vocal range. She could however rely upon a voice of great power and volume and, at the same time, of considerable pliability, to which she added excellent interpretative capability and, moreover, extraordinary physical beauty. This last quality made her not only the subject of many love affairs but also the ideal model for many contemporary painters including Andrea Appiani.

Faithful to her "old" master and partner Crescentini's musical ideals, Grassini would always stand beside such singers as the castrato Gaspare Pacchiarotti, the tenors Matteo Babini, Giovanni Ansani and Giacomo David, the prime-donne Brigida Banti and Luísa Todi de Agujar. These were the singers who opposed the belcanto drift of the second half of the 18th century, with its break-neck run after extremely high notes and aimlessly pyrotechnic, inexpressive, and therefore absurd coloratura; and who endeavoured, instead, to recover “the passion and vigour” that had permeated the golden age of singing of the first half of the century.

She was therefore one of a particular group of leading singers who in this way helped to establish a new artistic trend, which soon evolved into 'the Rossini grand finale'  of an entire musical era. Being the youngest of all the mentioned singers, Grassini herself formed a living link between them and the following generation. Acute (as usual) when writing about opera, Stendhal observed of his favourite singer of the new generation, Giuditta Pasta:"(She) is too young to have heard Signora Todi on the stage; nor can she have heard Pacchierotti, Marchesi or Crescentini; nor, as far as I can discover, did she ever have occasion to hear them later, after their retirement, in private performances or at concerts; yet every connoisseur who ever heard these great representatives of the Golden Age voices the general opinion that she appears to have inherited their style. The only teacher from whom she has received singing-lessons is Signora Grassini, with whom she once spent a season in Brescia",and alongside whom—Stendhal could have added—she had been an ideal Curiatius in several revivals of Cimarosa's opera.

Main roles created
The list below although not exhaustive is representative of Grassini's career.

Sources 
Bruno Belli, Giuseppina Grassini. Del canto più soave e drammatico inimitabile modello, Varese, Macchione editore, 2019, .
 Salvatore Caruselli (ed), Grande enciclopedia della musica lirica, vol 4, Longanesi &C. Periodici S.p.A., Roma
 Rodolfo Celletti, Storia del belcanto, Discanto Edizioni, Fiesole, 1983
 Max Gallo, Napoléon, Paris, Edition Robert Laffont, 1997,  (quoted from the Italian translation, Arnoldo Mondadori Editore, Biblioteca Storica del quotidiano Il Giornale)
 André Gavoty, La Grassini, Paris, 1947
 Giovanni Morelli, “«E voi pupille tenere», uno sguardo furtivo, errante, agli «Orazi» di Domenico Cimarosa e altri”, essay included in Teatro dell’Opera's Programme for the performances of Gli Orazi e i Curiazi, Rome, 1989.
 Stanley Sadie (ed), The New Grove Dictionary of Opera, Oxford University Press, 1992, vol 4, ad nomen
 Stendhal, Vie de Rossini, Paris, Boulland, 1824 (quoted from: Life of Rossini (translated by Richard N. Coe), London, Calder & Boyars, 1970)
 This article is a substantial translation from Giuseppina Grassini in the Italian Wikipedia.

Notes

References 

1773 births
1850 deaths
Italian contraltos
18th-century Italian actresses
Italian stage actresses
18th-century Italian women opera singers
19th-century Italian women opera singers
Mistresses of Napoleon